Fishtank Ensemble is a world music group from Los Angeles, California, known for their unique, high-energy and virtuosic stage show that blends a wide range of styles including Balkan, Romanian, gypsy, French hot jazz, flamenco, Turkish, Greek, and a little rock 'n' roll.

Band history
Fishtank Ensemble first formed and performed together at The Fishtank in Oakland, California in January 2004. They are one of many bands to be commonly associated with the California-based eclectic indie band Estradasphere. The band's premiere performances were recorded live. These recordings would become the band's debut full-length CD, Super Raoul, which was released November 2005.

In November 2007, Fishtank Ensemble self-released a second full-length album of material called Samurai Over Serbia.  On Samurai Over Serbia, traditional eastern European, gypsy jazz, klezmer and original tunes are arranged to fit the ensemble’s unconventional, but imaginative sound.

In recent years, the group has been performing consistently throughout the United States and Europe.

In 2010, the band released their 3rd full-length CD, Woman in Sin.  Like the ones before this, it featured a unique and unusual blend of traditional and original music and was both self-produced and self-released.

Band bio
LA Weekly calls them "cross pollinated gypsy music ... one of the most thrilling young acts on the planet." Formed in 2005 and playing everywhere from the hippest LA clubs to festivals, cultural centers, museums, parades, and even on the street, the band includes two explosive violins, the world's best slap bass player, musical saw, flamenco and gypsy jazz guitar, trombone, opera, jazz and gypsy vocals, accordion and one little banjolele. Tackling everything from French hot jazz to wild Serbian and Transylvanian gypsy anthems, Flamenco, and oddball originals, the band is a not to be missed event for world music lovers.

The dynamic, virtuosic, fiery and peripatetic quartet that comprises Fishtank Ensemble take their roots both from their own varied musical and national backgrounds, as well as from their adventures and travels. The singer Ursula sang opera on the streets and town squares of Italy, until she found a love of gypsy music ... their French violinist voyaged around all of Europe in a handmade mule-drawn caravan for ten years, collecting music and experiences. Their Serbian bass player has spent time playing with gypsies as well as some of the rock and roll's legends, and aptly defends his reputation as the best slap bass player in the world ... and the guitarist is a master of flamenco and gypsy jazz guitar who honed his craft in the gypsy caves of Granada, Spain.

Band members

Current members
 2004 to present - Fabrice Martinez; violin and violintromba.
 2004 to present - Ursula Knudson; saw, vocals, violin, banjolele, percussion, theremin
 2004 to present - Douglas Smolens (aka El Douje); flamenco guitar.
 2007 to present - Djordje Stijepovic; Double bass.

Past members
 2004 to 2008 - Aaron Seeman (aka Duckmandu); accordion.
 2004 to 2007 - Kevin Kmetz; shamisen
 2004 to 2006 - Tim Smolens; double bass (recording sessions)
 2004 to 2005 - Glenn Allen; double bass (2005 tour)
 2004 to 2005 - Adam Stacey; percussion
 2007 to 2008 - Mike Penny; shamisen.

Discography 
Fishtank at the Fishtank (2004) (limited release)
Super Raoul (2005)
Fishtank Ensemble, Live at the Freight & Salvage (2007) DVD of live performance, includes interviews with members.
Samurai Over Serbia (2007)
Woman in Sin (2010)
Edge of the World (2014)

Reviews
"The whimsical name of the group belies the fact that these musicians play hard, fast, and serious. There’s nothing fishy about them. In fact, there’s no slouching or mannered excesses, as Fishtank Ensemble comes armed, loaded and ready to serve you up a platter of intense nearly cosmic gypsy music."—Joel Okida

Notes

External links 
Official Website

American world music groups